Arboll is a place in the parish of Tarbat, Easter Ross, Highland, northern Scotland made up of several scattered farms.

References

Populated places in Ross and Cromarty